The Vodacom Cup was an annual rugby union competition in South Africa. Annual Vodacom Cup competitions were played between its inaugural season in 1998 and 2015 and was contested between February and May each year. The Vodacom Cup was the successor of the Bankfin Nite Series which was played in 1996 and 1997. Mobile communications provider Vodacom was the title sponsor for the entire duration of the competition.

The competition was the third most prestigious in South African rugby, behind Super Rugby and the Currie Cup. It was contested at roughly the same time as Super Rugby each season from February to June and featured a combination of Super Rugby players returning from injury, reserve players attempting to maintain their fitness levels and younger players trying to break through to the Super Rugby or Currie Cup sides. It therefore served as an important developmental competition for South African rugby.

The competition was held every season between the fourteen South African rugby unions, but several additional teams also took part during the competition's history. Namibian side the  played in the competition between 1999 and 2001, in 2010, 2011 and in 2015.

The Golden Lions also won the competition for three consecutive seasons between 2002 and 2004.

Between 2001 and 2004, the competition was split into two tier, with the top half of teams competing for the Vodacom Cup and the bottom half competing for the Vodacom Shield.

The final edition of the competition was in 2015, with SARU deciding to restructure the domestic competitions from the 2016 season onwards. A competition called the Rugby Challenge succeeded the Vodacom Cup in 2017.

Teams

The results of the teams that participated in the Vodacom Cup throughout the competition's history is as follows:

Finals

The results of the finals played in the Vodacom Cup competition are as follows:

The Vodacom Cup Trophy

Overall Record

The overall record for the teams in the Vodacom Cup competition is as follows:

Vodacom Shield
From 2001 to 2004, the teams finishing outside the top 4 in the pool phases played in a secondary competition called the Vodacom Shield.

Finals

The results of the finals played in the Vodacom Shield competition are as follows:

Overall Record

The overall record for the teams in the Vodacom Cup competition is as follows:

See also
 Bankfin Nite Series
 SuperSport Rugby Challenge

Notes and references

External links
Fight on for Currie Cup places
Falcons soar over Wildebeest 
Griquas clinch Vodacom title at the death

 
1998 establishments in South Africa
Recurring sporting events established in 1998
2015 disestablishments in South Africa
Recurring sporting events disestablished in 2015